Dunmere may refer to:
Dunmere, Cornwall, UK
Dunmere, Rhode Island, USA